Jenny McCauley (born 8 July 1974) is an Irish cyclist. She competed in the women's cross-country mountain biking event at the 2004 Summer Olympics.

References

External links
 

1974 births
Living people
Irish female cyclists
Olympic cyclists of Ireland
Cyclists at the 2004 Summer Olympics
Sportspeople from Dublin (city)